David Short Dennison Jr. (July 29, 1918 – September 21, 2001) was an American politician of the Republican party who served in the United States House of Representatives from 1957 to 1959.

Biography

Dennison was born in Poland, Mahoning County, Ohio on July 29, 1918, and graduated from Western Reserve Academy, Hudson, Ohio, in 1936. He graduated from Williams College, Williamstown, Massachusetts, in 1940 and Western Reserve University School of Law, now Case Western Reserve University School of Law, Cleveland, Ohio in 1945.

Dennison worked for American Field Service 1942 to 1943, and was a lawyer in private practice. He was special counsel for Warren, Ohio 1950–1951, and special assistant to the Ohio Attorney General 1953–1956.

Dennison was elected as a Republican to the 85th United States Congress, (January 3, 1957 - January 3, 1959), and was unsuccessful for election to the 86th and 87th Congresses in 1958 and 1960.

After his service in Congress, Dennison was a consultant to the Civil Rights Commission in 1959, and a member of the Federal Trade Commission, 1970–1974. Dennison voted in favor of the Civil Rights Act of 1957.

Dennison was later a business executive and died in Warren, Ohio September 21, 2001.

References

Sources

1918 births
2001 deaths
People from Poland, Ohio
Williams College alumni
Case Western Reserve University School of Law alumni
Ohio lawyers
Federal Trade Commission personnel
20th-century American politicians
Western Reserve Academy alumni
20th-century American lawyers
American Field Service personnel of World War II

Republican Party members of the United States House of Representatives from Ohio